Guillaume-Gabriel Nivers (c. 1632, Paris – 13 November 1714) was a French organist, composer and theorist. His first livre d'orgue is the earliest surviving published collection with traditional French organ school forms (a collection by Louis Couperin that is in manuscript does not seem to have been published. See Guy Oldham, "Louis Couperin: A New Source of French Keyboard Music of the Mid-17th Century", Recherches sur la musique française classique, Vol. I (1960), pp. 51–59). Nivers's other music is less known; however, his treatises on Gregorian chant and basso continuo are still considered important sources on 17th century liturgical music and performance practice.

Life

Nivers was born into a prosperous Parisian family: his father was a fermier générale (tax collector) for the bishop. Nothing is known of his early years or his musical training except that he may have received a degree from the University of Paris. In the early 1650s Nivers became organist of Saint-Sulpice, a post he would retain until 1702. In 1668 the composer married; he had one son.

Nivers's subsequent career was quite illustrious. On 19 June 1678 he was chosen as one of the four organists of the Chapelle Royale—an ensemble of musicians who performed sacred music for the king. The other three organists were Nicolas Lebègue, Jacques Thomelin and Jean-Baptiste Buterne. Nivers only resigned late in life, in 1708, and was succeeded by Louis Marchand. This prestigious post was followed by another in 1681, when the composer succeeded Henri Dumont as master of music to the queen. Finally, in 1686 Nivers was in charge of the music at the Maison Royale de Saint-Louis in Saint-Cyr-l'École—a convent school for young ladies who were poor but of noble birth. Nivers apparently had difficulties with the founder of the school, Madame de Maintenon, but retained the post until his death. His colleagues at St Cyr were Jean-Baptiste Moreau, who worked there since the school's inception, and possibly Louis-Nicolas Clérambault, who may have helped Nivers from about 1710 until the latter's death in 1714. Clérambault succeeded Nivers both at St Sulpice and St Cyr.

During his lifetime, Nivers was highly regarded not only as organist and composer but also as a music theorist. His treatise on composition (Traité de la composition de musique, 1667) was well known outside France and endured into the 18th century. His work in the field of Gregorian chant resulted in influential editions of liturgical music (including an edition of Missa cunctipotens genitor Deus, which most French organ composers used as a model for their mass settings) and helped the Catholic Counter Reformation.

Work
Nivers composed several religious vocal works, and published three organ books (1665, 1667, 1675) containing more than 200 pieces. They include suites in all ancient (ecclesiastical) modes, a mass, hymns, and settings of the Deo Gratias and Te Deum. These books are the first collections of organ music to have been printed in France since Jean Titelouze's. With his colleague and friend Lebègue, Nivers embodies the solo organ style which was subsequently represented - and adorned - by François Couperin and the short-lived Nicolas de Grigny. Several theoretical treatises by Nivers are preserved. They remain useful sources for knowledge of both musical theory and practice of his time.

List of works
This is a partial list of surviving works by Nivers. See William Pruitt, "Bibliographie des Oeuvres de Guillaume Gabriel Nivers", Recherches sur la musique française classique, Vol. XIII (1973), pp. 133–156. Notes on other publications located after that article was published are in papers deposited in Cambridge University Library (U.K.). All of the published works were published in Paris; many were reprinted several times during the 17th and the 18th centuries, however, here only dates of first editions are given.

Instrumental
Livre d'orgue contenant cent pièces de tous les tons de l'église (1665)
2e livre d'orgue contenant la messe et les hymnes de l'église (1667)
3e livre d'orgue des huit tons de l'église (1675)
3 dances for lute (spurious)

Vocal
Motets а voix seule [...] et quelques autres motets а deux voix propres pour les religieuses (1689)
Miscellaneous works for the convent school at St Cyr: Cantique sur la conformité а la volonté de DieuChants de JephtéLe Temple de la paixOpéra de la vertuOpéra de sceauxLiturgical editionsGraduale romano-monasticum [...] in usum et gratiam monialium sub regula S.P.N. Benedicti, Augustini, Francisci militantium (1658)Chants des offices propres du séminaire de St-Sulpice (1668)Antiphonarium romanum [...] in usum et gratiam monialium sub regula S.P.N. Benedicti militantium (1671)Graduale romanum [...] in usum et gratiam monialium sub regula S.P.N. Augustini militantium (1687)Graduale monasticum [...] in usum et gratiam monialium sub regula S.P.N. Benedicti militantium (1687)Antiphonarium Praemonstratense (1680)Graduale Praemonstratense (1680)Passiones Domini N.J.C. cum lamentationibus Jeremiae prophetae, et formulis cantus ordinarii officii divini (1683)Offices divins а l'usage des dames et demoiselles établies par sa majesté à Saint-Cyr (1686)Antiphonarium monasticum ad usum sacri ordinis Cluniacensis (1693)Graduale romanum juxta missale sacro-sancti Concilii Tridentini (1697)Antiphonarium romanum juxta breviarium sacro-sancti Concilii Tridentini (1701)Les lamentations du prophète Jérémie (1704)
 (1706)Chants d'église à l'usage de la paroisse de St-Sulpice (1707)Processionale romanum juxta breviarium sacro-sancti Concilii Tridentini (1723)Chants et motets à l'usage de l'église et communauté des Dames de la royale maison de St-Louis à St-Cyr (1733, includes motets by Louis-Nicolas Clérambault)

WritingsObservations sur le toucher et jeu de l'orgue (1665, included in Livre d'orgue contenant cent pièces)Méthode facile pour apprendre à chanter la musique (1666, also attributed to Charles le Maire)Traité de la composition de musique (1667)Dissertation sur le chant grégorien (1683)L'art d'accompagner sur la basse continue (1689, included in Motets а voix seule)Méthode certaine pour apprendre le plain-chant de l'Église (1698)

Notes

References
Apel, Willi. 1972. The History of Keyboard Music to 1700. Translated by Hans Tischler. Indiana University Press. . Originally published as Geschichte der Orgel- und Klaviermusik bis 1700 by Bärenreiter-Verlag, Kassel.
Damschroder, David, and Russell Williams, David. 1990. Music Theory from Zarlino to Schenker: A Bibliography and Guide''. Pendragon Press. 

Pruitt, William. 1974, 1975. "The Organ Works of Guillaume Gabriel Nivers (1632–1714)", Recherches sur la musique française classique, Vols. XIV, pp. 1–81, and XV, pp. 47–79.

Free scores
e-Partitions Many newly edited and typeset organ scores.
Suite No. 2 from 3e Livre d'orgue: sheet music
Petits motets from the Royal Convent School at St.-Cyr at A-R Editions, includes a sample of Nivers' vocal work

1630s births
1714 deaths
Musicians from Paris
French male classical composers
French Baroque composers
French classical organists
French male organists
French music theorists
French male non-fiction writers
18th-century keyboardists
18th-century classical composers
18th-century French composers
18th-century French male musicians
17th-century male musicians
Male classical organists